Susan Durham is an American Board Certified Neurosurgeon and a Member of The Society of Neurological Surgeons. A professor of neurosurgery at the University of Southern California Keck School of Medicine, she is also Division Chief of Pediatric Neurosurgery at the Children's Hospital of Los Angeles.

Education & career 
After studying at the University of Pittsburgh School of Medicine, Durham did an internship and a residency in neurosurgery at the University of Pennsylvania. That was followed by a pediatric neurosurgery fellowship at Children's Hospital Los Angeles and a peripheral nerve fellowship at Louisiana State University School of Medicine. She also completed a Master of Science program at the Dartmouth Institute for Health Policy and Clinical Science.

Durhams treats craniosynostosis, peripheral nerve and brachial plexus lesions, spina bifida, pediatric brain tumors, hydrocephalus, tethered spinal cord, Chiari 1 malformation, and other conditions.

She also does research and publishes in these areas.

References 

Living people
American neurosurgeons
American neuroscientists
American women neuroscientists
University of Vermont faculty
University of Pittsburgh alumni
University of Pennsylvania alumni
Year of birth missing (living people)
Women surgeons
American women academics
21st-century American women